Following is a list of all Article III United States federal judges appointed by President Franklin Pierce during his presidency. In total Pierce appointed 16 Article III federal judges, including 1 Justice to the Supreme Court of the United States, 3 judges to the United States circuit courts, and 12 judges to the United States district courts.

Pierce was also the first president to appoint judges, 3 total, to the United States Court of Claims, an Article I tribunal.

United States Supreme Court justices

Circuit courts

District courts

Specialty courts (Article I)

United States Court of Claims

Notes

References
General

 

Specific

Sources
 Federal Judicial Center

Judicial appointments
Pierce